Jacksonville is an unincorporated community located within Springfield Township, in Burlington County, New Jersey, United States. Located at a skewed intersection of County Routes 628 and 670, the area consists of farmland, houses, and the remains of the Animal Kingdom Zoo, a small zoo shuttered since 2012 due to deadly fires and numerous animal welfare violations.

References

External links
Springfield Township Area Map

Springfield Township, Burlington County, New Jersey
Unincorporated communities in Burlington County, New Jersey
Unincorporated communities in New Jersey